Jennifer Victoria O'Neill (born 19 April 1990) is a Puerto Rican professional basketball player who has played in the Women's National Basketball Association (WNBA).

Career

College
O'Neill played for the Kentucky Wildcats, where she was SEC 6th Woman of the Year in 2014 and 2015.

Professional career
In May 2015, O'Neill signed a training camp contract with the Minnesota Lynx and made the final cut for the roster. She made her WNBA debut on 5 June 2015, scoring 2 points, 4 rebounds and 1 assist in 10 minutes in a win over the Tulsa Shock. On 22 July 2015, O'Neill was waived by the Lynx after playing 13 games. During the 2015–16 WNBA off-season, O'Neill played in Israel for Hapoel Rishon Le-Zion and in Puerto Rico for Gigantes de Carolina. In February 2016, O'Neill signed with the Connecticut Sun but was waived before the beginning of the 2016 season. The following off-season O'Neill played in Bulgaria for Haskovo 2012. In February 2017, O'Neill signed a training camp contract with the Seattle Storm.

Kentucky statistics
Source

WNBA career statistics

Regular season

|-
| align="left" | 2015
| align="left" | Minnesota
| 13 || 0 || 7.8 || .348 || .556 || 1.000 || 1.1 || 0.8 || 0.2 || 0.1 || 0.7 || 2.2
|-
| align="left" | Career
| align="left" | 1 year, 1 team
| 13 || 0 || 7.8 || .348 || .556 || 1.000 || 1.1 || 0.8 || 0.2 || 0.1 || 0.7 || 2.2

References

External links

1990 births
Living people
American expatriate basketball people in Bulgaria
American expatriate basketball people in Poland
American expatriate basketball people in Russia
American women's basketball players
Basketball players at the 2019 Pan American Games
Basketball players at the 2020 Summer Olympics
Basketball players from New York City
Puerto Rican expatriate basketball people in Bulgaria
Puerto Rican expatriate basketball people in Poland
Kentucky Wildcats women's basketball players
Minnesota Lynx players
Olympic basketball players of Puerto Rico
Pan American Games bronze medalists for Puerto Rico
Pan American Games medalists in basketball
Point guards
Puerto Rican expatriate basketball people in Russia
Medalists at the 2019 Pan American Games
Undrafted Women's National Basketball Association players
Sportspeople from the Bronx